Padampur (also known as Padmapur) is a town and a notified area in Bargarh district in the Indian state of Odisha.

Geography
It is almost  from its district headquarters, Bargarh.

Demographics
 India census, Padampur had a population of 15,438. Males constitute 51% of the population and females 49%. Padampur has an average literacy rate of 69%, lower than the national average of 74.04%: male literacy is 78%, and female literacy is 60%. In Padampur, 12% of the population is under 6 years of age.

Politics
MLA from Padmapur Assembly Constituency was Bijaya Ranjan Singh Bariha of BJD, who won the seat in State elections in 2019. He died on 3 October, 2022. 

Padampur used to be part of Sambalpur (Lok Sabha constituency).Now, it comes under Bargarh Lok Sabha constituency, which is now represented by Suresh Pujari, BJP.

References

Cities and towns in Bargarh district